An Angel at My Table is a 1990 biographical drama film directed by Jane Campion.  The film is based on Janet Frame's three autobiographies, To the Is-Land (1982), An Angel at My Table (1984), and The Envoy from Mirror City (1984). The film was very well received. It won awards at the New Zealand Film and Television awards, the Toronto International Film Festival, and second prize at the Venice Film Festival.

Synopsis
An Angel at My Table is a dramatisation of the autobiographies of New Zealand author Janet Frame. Originally produced as a television miniseries, the film, as with Frame's autobiographies, is divided into three sections, with the lead role played by three actresses who portray Frame at different stages of her life: Alexia Keogh (child), Karen Fergusson (teenager), and Kerry Fox (adult). The film follows Frame from when she grows up in a poor family, through her years in a mental institution, and into her writing years after her release.

Cast
 Kerry Fox as Janet Frame (adult)
 Alexia Keogh as Janet Frame (child)
 Karen Fergusson as Janet Frame (teenager)
 Iris Churn as Mother
 Kevin J. Wilson as Father
 Melina Bernecker as Myrtle
 Glynis Angell as Isabel
 Mark Morrison as Bruddie Frame (child)
 Sarah Llewellyn as June Frame (child)
 Natasha Gray as Leslie
 Brenda Kendall as Miss Botting
 Martyn Sanderson as Frank Sargeson

Awards
 New Zealand Film and TV Awards (1990):
 Best Cinematography: Stuart Dryburgh
 Best Director: Jane Campion
 Best Film
 Best Performance in Supporting Role: Martyn Sanderson
 Best Female Performance: Kerry Fox
 Best Screenplay: Laura Jones
 Toronto International Film Festival (1990):
 International Critics Award: Jane Campion
 Valladolid International Film Festival (1990):
 Best Actress: Kerry Fox
 Venice Film Festival (1990)
 Elvira Notari Prize: Jane Campion
 Filmcritica "Bastone Bianco" Award: Jane Campion
 Grand Special Jury Prize: Jane Campion
 Little Golden Lion Award: Jane Campion
 OCIC Award: Jane Campion
 Belgian Syndicate of Cinema Critics (UCC) (1992):
 Grand Prix
 Chicago Film Critics Association (CFCA) (1992):
 CFCA Award: Best Foreign Language Film
 Independent Spirit Awards (1992)
 Best Foreign Film: Jane Campion

Impact and reception
An Angel at My Table was the first film from New Zealand to be screened at the Venice Film Festival, where it received multiple standing ovations and was awarded the Grand Special Jury Prize despite evoking yells of protest that it did not win The Golden Lion. In addition to virtually sweeping the local New Zealand film awards, it also took home the prize for best foreign film at the Independent Spirit Awards and the International Critics' Award at the Toronto International Film Festival. The film not only established Jane Campion as an emerging director and launched the career of Kerry Fox, but it also introduced a broader audience to Janet Frame's writing.

Roger Ebert gave the film 4 out of 4 stars, stating; "[The film] tells its story calmly and with great attention to human detail and, watching it, I found myself drawn in with a rare intensity". The film also received praise in The Guardian where film critic Derek Malcolm called it "one of the very best films of the year". The Sydney Morning Herald wrote, "Angel is a film where almost every image strikes the eye with the vividness of an inspired art composition: one where small incidents gain magical properties". Variety said the film is "potentially painful and harrowing...imbued with gentle humor and great compassion, which makes every character come vividly alive". In 2019, the BBC polled 368 film experts from 84 countries to name the 100 greatest films directed by women, with An Angel at My Table voted at No. 47.

References

External links 
 
 
 An Angel at My Table at Turner Classic Movies
 NZ On Screen page
 An Angel at My Table at Oz Movies
 An Angel at My Table: Alone, Naturally an essay by Amy Taubin at the Criterion Collection

1990 films
1990s New Zealand films
1990 drama films
1990 independent films
1990s biographical drama films
1990s coming-of-age drama films
1990s feminist films
Australian biographical drama films
Biographical films about writers
British biographical drama films
Films directed by Jane Campion
Films set in New Zealand
Films shot in New Zealand
Independent Spirit Award for Best Foreign Film winners
New Zealand biographical drama films
Venice Grand Jury Prize winners
Works by Janet Frame
1990s English-language films
Films about sisters
Films about puberty
1990s British films
Films set in psychiatric hospitals
Films about depression